Mark Petchey and Danny Sapsford were the defending champions, but did not partner together this year.  Petchey partnered Sargis Sargsian, losing in the first round.  Sapsford partnered Chris Wilkinson, losing in the final.

Ellis Ferreira and Patrick Galbraith won the title, defeating Sapsford and Wilkinson 4–6, 7–6, 7–6 in the final.

Seeds

  Ellis Ferreira /  Patrick Galbraith (champions)
  Rick Leach /  Byron Talbot (first round)
  Jan Siemerink /  Cyril Suk (first round)
  Donald Johnson /  Francisco Montana (semifinals)

Draw

Draw

External links
 Draw

Nottingham Open
1997 ATP Tour